Picture This is the fourth studio album released by Scottish pop rock quartet Wet Wet Wet. Released on 10 April 1995, the album was the band's first studio release since the release of their long-running Number #1 single, "Love Is All Around". As well as featuring the aforementioned track, the album spawned five further singles: "Julia Says", "Don't Want to Forgive Me Now", "Somewhere Somehow", "She's All on My Mind" and "Morning". The album peaked at #1 on the UK Albums Chart, becoming one of the band's bestselling releases to date.

In 2015, to mark twenty years of the album's release, a souvenir edition, The Big Picture, was made available, in the form of a double disc deluxe edition and a box set containing three discs and a DVD, entitled All Around and in the Crowd, containing a concert filmed at Wembley Arena on 30 July 1995, plus six promotional videos and five performances from Top of the Pops between 1994 and 1996. The band also embarked on a 2016 tour in honour of the album, playing seven of the twelve tracks featured on the record.

Track listing

Charts

Certifications

References

1995 albums
Mercury Records albums
Wet Wet Wet albums